Soestdijk is a railway station located in Soestdijk, Netherlands. The station was opened on 27 June 1898 on the single track Den Dolder–Baarn railway.

Train services
The following train services call at Soestdijk:

Bus services

External links
NS website 
Dutch Public Transport journey planner 

Railway stations in Utrecht (province)
Railway stations opened in 1898
Railway stations on the Stichtse lijn
Soest, Netherlands